Fakhreh (’ also known as Fakhrābād) is a village in Kavirat Rural District, Kavirat District, Aran va Bidgol County, Isfahan Province, Iran. At the 2006 census, its population was 445, in 103 families.

References 

Populated places in Aran va Bidgol County